Karl McKeegan (born 1978) is an Irish former hurler who played as a centre-back at senior level for the Antrim county team.

Playing career
McKeegan began his hurling career at juvenile and underage levels with the Ruairí Óg club in Cushendall. He was still eligible for the minor grade when he joined the club's senior team in 1995. McKeegan spent over 20 years lining out for the senior team, during which time he won five Ulster SCHC titles and seven Antrim SHC titles. He ended his club career after a defeat by Na Piarsaigh in the 2016 All-Ireland club final.

McKeegan first appeared on the inter-county scene at underage level with Antrim and won two Ulster MHC titles and three Ulster U21HC titles. He joined the senior team in 2002 and won ten consecutive Ulster SHC medals during a ten-year career. McKeegan captained Antrim to the Christy Ring Cup title in 2006.

Management career
McKeegan spent three seasons in charge of the Antrim under-20 team before being named as the Armagh senior hurling team manager in October 2022.

Honours
Ruairí Óg
Ulster Senior Club Hurling Championship: 1996, 1999, 2006, 2008, 2015
Antrim Senior Hurling Championship: 1996, 1999, 2005, 2006, 2008, 2014, 2015
Antrim Under-21 Hurling Championship: 1999

Antrim
Christy Ring Cup: 2006
Ulster Senior Hurling Championship: 2002, 2003, 2004, 2005, 2006, 2007, 2008, 2009, 2010, 2011
Ulster Under-21 Hurling Championship: 1996, 1998, 1999
Ulster Minor Hurling Championship: 1995, 1996

References

1978 births
Living people
Antrim inter-county hurlers
Hurling managers
Ruairi Og Cushendall hurlers
Ulster inter-provincial hurlers